The Council of Serbian Unity (SSJ) was a political party in Serbia, founded in 2013 by Borislav Pelević.

The Council of Serbian Unity is a re-founding of the Party of Serbian Unity previously led by Pelević before it merged into the Serbian Radical Party (SRS) in 2007. Following the 2008 split in the SRS and founding of the Serbian Progressive Party (SNS), Pelević was elected MP on the SNS ballot in the 2012 election but soon developed disagreements over SNS policies on Kosovo and the EU, eventually leaving the SNS parliamentary group and becoming an independent MP.

Due to the new registration law The Council of Serbian Unity did not have time enough to register in time for the 2014 election instead they run as Group of Citizen-Patriotic Front gaining only 0.1% of the votes.

References

External links
 Official website

Nationalist parties in Serbia
Political parties established in 2013
2013 establishments in Serbia
Serb nationalist parties